As of 2013, there was an installed capacity of 2,599 megawatts (MW) of wind power in Romania, up from the 7 MW installed capacity in 2007.
Until December 2010, Romania added around 440 MW to its installed wind capacity from two wind farms: Fântânele-Cogealac and the EDP Peștera. The Fântânele-Cogealac Wind Farm has been completed in 2012 and at the time was the largest in Europe.

Romania has a wind-power potential of around 14,000 MW, and an energy-generating capacity of 23 terawatt-hours. The country's wind power capacity that can be assimilated by the national transport grid is between 3,000 MW and 9,000 MW, while only in the last two years the total power of the requests for connecting to it was about 22.800 MW. The Dobrogea region, which consists of Constanța and Tulcea counties, has the second-highest wind potential in Europe.

Several companies are interested in investing in wind farms in Romania. The Italian company Enel Green Power, a subsidiary of Enel, plans to build several wind farms with a total capacity of 350 MW. The Swiss conglomerate Cofra Group plans to build two large wind farms, one that will have a capacity of 700 MW in Dobruja and one that will have a capacity of 400 MW in Neamț and Suceava counties; the total investment will amount to  $1.65 billion. In 2008, Iberdrola bought 50 wind farm projects, with a combined installed capacity 1,600 MW, from two companies for $450 million.
Romanian companies interested in building wind farms include Electrica and Green Energy, which have plans to build wind farms that will have an installed capacity of 310 MW with total investments of $420 million. The Hungarian company Sinus Holding will build five wind farms in the Northern Moldavia region, having an installed capacity of 700 MW and totaling $800 million in capital investment, that will be built by December 2009.

Largest projects

These are the most important wind farm projects in Romania (larger than 10 MW):

Totals

See also 

Global Wind Energy Council
World Wind Energy Association (WWEA)
European Wind Energy Association
Wind power
Wind power in the European Union
 List of wind farms
 List of onshore wind farms
 List of large wind farms
 Wind turbine
 List of wind turbine manufacturers
 Wind power industry

References

External links

 
Romania
Wind power